Costeşti is a city in Rîșcani District, in northern Moldova.

Overview 

Costești has a population of 4,109 at the 2004 census. It is composed of the city itself, population 2,247, and four villages: Dămășcani, population 361, Duruitoarea, population 379, Păscăuți, population 950, and Proscureni, population 172.

The Stânca-Costeşti Dam is a dam on the Prut River and a checkpoint between Moldova and Romania. The dam is located between Costești and Stânca, in Botoșani County, Romania.

References

Cities and towns in Moldova
Rîșcani District
Moldova–Romania border crossings
Populated places on the Prut